Let's Turn Back the Years is an album by American country singer Ernest Tubb, released in 1969.

Track listing
"Let's Turn Back the Years" (Hank Williams)
"I Need Attention Bad" (Ernest Tubb, Baba Stewart)
"Yesterday's Tears" (Tubb)
"I'm Free at Last" (Lewis G. Candys)
"Give My Love to Rose" (Johnny Cash)
"Send Me the Pillow That You Dream On" (Hank Locklin)
"Blue Eyed Elaine" (Tubb)
"Our Baby's Book" (Tubb)
"I'll Go on Alone" (Marty Robbins)
"Today" (Hank Thompson)
"You Won't Ever Forget Me" (Tubb, Lois Snapp)

Personnel
Ernest Tubb – vocals, guitar
Billy Parker – guitar
Steve Chapman – guitar
Buddy Charleton – pedal steel guitar
Noel Stanley – bass
Harold Bradley – bass
James Wilkerson – bass
Errol Jernigan – drums
Hargus "Pig" Robbins – piano
Larry Butler – piano

References

Ernest Tubb albums
1969 albums
Albums produced by Owen Bradley
Decca Records albums